The Jubilee line corruption trial (R. v. Mills and others) was a trial at the Old Bailey in London, which began in June 2003 – and lasted 21 months – collapsing in March 2005. It raised doubts about the willingness of juries who are mandatorily drawn at random from the working-age population to hear very long, all-day trials. Six men were charged with attempting to bribe London transport officials over contracts in relation to the extension to the Jubilee line of the London Underground.

The trial encountered a series of difficulties, including the discharge of two jurors for personal reasons. Another continued, having been promised she would be able to get married and go on honeymoon in June 2005, but it later became clear the trial would still be running. Also, two defendants fell ill. The trial finally ended when a juror "went on strike". The Director of Public Prosecutions decided that a fair trial was not possible, and the accused men were acquitted. This was a blow to the judge, Ann Felicity Goddard. The cost of the police investigation, legal prosecution and rest of the trial including juror's outlay was about £60 million. It is thought that the trial may have been successful if Goddard had agreed to let the jury only attend in the mornings.

It has been described as one of the longest jury trials to have occurred in the UK, although a subsequent case in Scotland in 2017 sat for more days. It was little publicised until after its collapse due to standard reporting restrictions.

The juror who brought about the collapse said that the trial caused him loss of earnings that threatened his ability to pay Oxford University fees for a course set to start in October 2005. The juror who was due to marry lost her wedding date and her job.

References

2005 in case law
London Underground
2005 in London
English criminal case law
Corruption in England
Trials in London
Railway litigation in 2005
2005 in British law